Playa de Getares is a beach in the municipality of Algeciras, southeastern Spain.

The name comes from a Roman fish salting factory which was located in the old Roman town in the vicinity of Caetaria, and was called Cetares, and then Xetares during the Middle Ages, named in the chronicles of Alfonso XI. The whole beach is surrounded by terraced housing developments and has a promenade with bars and restaurants.

References

External links
Video

Algeciras
Beaches of Andalusia
Geography of the Province of Cádiz